Alan Glynn is an Irish writer born in 1960 in Dublin.

Glynn studied English literature at Trinity College Dublin.

Awards and honours 

2011 Irish Book Award, Crime Fiction category, Bloodland

Works

Novels 

 The Dark Fields (2001), republished as Limitless (2011)
 Winterland (2009)
 Bloodland (2011)
 Graveland (2013)
 Paradime (2016) 
 Under the Night (2019), US Title: Receptor

Adaptations 

 Limitless (2011, by Neil Burger). Was based on his novel The Dark Fields. This film inspired a TV series with the same name that debuted on CBS on September 22, 2015. After the success of the film, the novel was re-published under the name Limitless.

References 

Living people
Irish writers
1960 births
People from Drumcondra, Dublin
Alumni of Trinity College Dublin